Dorothy Annie Elizabeth Garrod, CBE, FBA (5 May 1892 – 18 December 1968) was an English archaeologist who specialised in the Palaeolithic period. She held the position of Disney Professor of Archaeology at the University of Cambridge from 1939 to 1952, and was the first woman to hold a chair at either Oxford or Cambridge.

Early life and education
Garrod was the daughter of the physician Sir Archibald Garrod and Laura Elizabeth Smith, daughter of the surgeon Sir Thomas Smith, 1st Baronet. She was born in Chandos Street, London, and was educated at home. Her first teacher was Isabel Fry as governess. Garrod recalled Fry teaching her, at age nine, in Harley Street with the daughter of Walter Jessop. She later attended Birklands School in St Albans.

Pamela Jane Smith writes of Garrod as follows:
"Garrod was a solid member of Britain’s intellectual aristocracy. Her father, Sir Archibald Garrod, had been Regius Professor of Medicine at Oxford and is regarded as the founder of biochemical genetics; her grandfather was Sir Alfred Garrod of King’s College Hospital, Physician Extraordinary to Queen Victoria and a leading authority on rheumatic diseases."

In 1913, Garrod entered Newnham College, Cambridge. She read ancient and classical history before archaeology was available as a subject, completing the course in 1916. She had three brothers, two of whom were killed in action in WW I and the youngest of whom died in France from Spanish influenza shortly before demobilisation. She undertook war work with the Catholic Women's League, until she was demobilised in 1919. She then went to Malta, where her father was working, and began to take an interest in the local antiquities.
There is considerable disagreement over the date in which she become a Roman Catholic convert. Garrod apparently converted to Catholicism prior to coming up to Cambridge.

Career

On her family's return to England, where they settled in Oxford, Garrod read for a graduate diploma in anthropology at the Pitt Rivers Museum. There she was taught by Robert Ranulph Marett and received a distinction on graduating in 1921, as one among a small number of female students. She had found an intellectual vocation: the archaeology of the Palaeolithic Age. She then studied for two years, 1922 to 1924, with the French prehistorian Abbé Breuil at the Institut de Paleontologie Humaine in Paris.

On completing her studies, Garrod began to excavate in Gibraltar. Following a recommendation from Breuil, she investigated Devil's Tower Cave, which was only 350 metres from Forbes' Quarry, where a Neanderthal skull had been found earlier. Garrod discovered in this cave in 1925, a second important Neanderthal skull now called Gibraltar 2.

In 1926, Garrod published her first academic work, The Upper Paleolithic of Britain, for which she was awarded a B. Sc. degree by the University of Oxford. In 1928, she headed an expedition through South Kurdistan that led to the excavation of Hazar Merd Cave and Zarzi cave.

In 1929, Garrod was appointed to direct excavations at Wadi el-Mughara at Mount Carmel in Mandatory Palestine, as a joint project of the American School of Prehistoric Research and the British School of Archaeology in Jerusalem. The series of 12 extensive excavations was completed over 22 months. The results established a chronological framework that remains crucial to present understanding of that prehistoric period. Working closely with Dorothea Bate, she demonstrated a long sequence of Lower Palaeolithic, Middle Palaeolithic and Epipalaeolithic occupations in the caves of Tabun, El Wad, Es Skhul, Shuqba (Shuqbah) and Kebara Cave. She also coined the cultural label for the late Epipalaeolithic Natufian culture (from Wadi an-Natuf, the location of the Shuqba cave) following her excavations at Es Skhul and El Wad. Her excavations at the cave sites in the Levant were conducted with almost exclusively women workers recruited from local villages. One of these women, Yusra, is credited with the discovery of the Tabun 1 Neanderthal skull. Her excavations were also the first to use aerial photography.

In 1937, Garrod published The Stone Age of Mount Carmel, considered a ground-breaking work in the field. In 1938, she travelled to Bulgaria and excavated the Palaeolithic cave of Bacho Kiro.

After holding a number of academic positions, including Newnham College's Director of Studies for Archaeology and Anthropology, she became the Disney Professor of Archaeology at Cambridge on 6 May 1939, a post she held until 1952. Her appointment was greeted with excitement by women students and a "college feast" was held in her honour at Newnham, in which every dish was named after an archaeological item. In addition, the Cambridge Review reported, "The election of a woman to the Disney Professorship of Archaeology is an immense step forward towards complete equality between men and women in the University." Gender equality at the University of Cambridge at the time was still remote: as a woman, Garrod could not be a full member of the University, so that she was excluded from speaking or voting on University matters. This continued to apply until 1948, when women became full members of the University.

From 1941 to 1945, Garrod took leave of absence from the university and served in the Women's Auxiliary Air Force (WAAF) during the Second World War. She was based at the RAF Medmenham photographic interpretation unit as a section officer (equivalent in rank to flying officer).

After the war, Garrod returned to her position and made a number of changes to the department, including the introduction of a module of study on world prehistory. Where previously prehistory had been considered particularly French or European, Garrod expanded the subject to a global scale. Garrod also made changes to the structure of archaeology studies, so turning Cambridge into the first British university to offer undergraduate courses in prehistoric archaeology. During the university summer vacations, Garrod travelled to France and excavated at two important sites: Fontéchevade cave, with Germaine Henri-Martin, and Angles-sur-l'Anglin, with Suzanne de St. Mathurin.

Later life
On her retirement in 1952, Garrod moved to France, but continued to research and excavate. In 1958, aged 66, she excavated on the Aadloun headland in Lebanon, with the assistance of Diana Kirkbride. The following year she was asked urgently to excavate at Ras El Kelb, as a significant cave had been disturbed by road and rail construction. Henri-Martin and de St. Mathurin assisted Garrod for seven weeks, with the remaining material being removed to the National Museum of Beirut for more detailed study. She returned to Aadloun again in 1963, with a team of younger archaeologists, but her health began to fail and she was often absent from the sites.

Garrod appeared as a panellist in a 1959 episode of the game show Animal, Vegetable, Mineral? held at the Musée de l'Homme. 

In the summer of 1968, Garrod suffered a stroke while visiting relatives in Cambridge. She died in a nursing home there on 18 December, aged 76.

Diversity and inclusion 
Garrod was the first female professor at Cambridge and was instrumental in introducing women to the field of archaeology. On excavations, her crews were usually all or mainly women. She was passionate about supporting locals and their families; her Mount Carmel expedition crew consisted mostly of local Arab women. In 1931, she invited Francis Turville Petre, an openly gay man, to join her excavations of Mount Carmel.

Awards and recognition
In 1937, Garrod was awarded Honorary Doctorates from the University of Pennsylvania and Boston College and a DSc. from the University of Oxford. She was elected a Fellow of the British Academy in 1952, and in 1965 she was awarded the CBE. She felt it was important that archaeologists travel and therefore left money to found the Dorothy Garrod Travel Fund. In 1968, the Society of Antiquaries of London presented her with its Gold Medal.

From September 2011 to January 2012, 17 photographs of Garrod's of excavations, friends and mentors were displayed in 'A Pioneer of Prehistory, Dorothy Garrod and the Caves of Mount Carmel' at the Pitt Rivers Museum.

In 2017, Newnham College announced that a new college building will be named after Garrod. In 2019, the McDonald Institute for Archaeological Research at the University of Cambridge unveiled a new portrait of Garrod by artist Sara Levelle.

See also
Archaeology of Israel

References

Further reading

William Davies and Ruth Charles, eds (1999), Dorothy Garrod and the Progress of the Palaeolithic: Studies in the Prehistoric Archaeology of the Near East and Europe, Oxford: Oxbow Books
Pamela Jane Smith, (2005 Wayback Machine archive version of 1996 page) "From 'small, dark and alive' to 'cripplingly shy': Dorothy Garrod as the first woman Professor at Cambridge."
Pamela Jane Smith et al., (1997), "Dorothy Garrod in Words and Pictures", Antiquity 71 (272), pp. 265–270

External links

The Dorothy Garrod photographic archive at the Pitt Rivers Museum in Oxford
Dorothy Garrod (1892–1968): Eine Archäologin erobert die Eliteuniversität Cambridge 

1892 births
1968 deaths
20th-century archaeologists
20th-century English scientists
20th-century English women
20th-century British women scientists
English archaeologists
Alumni of Newnham College, Cambridge
Alumni of the University of Oxford
Disney Professors of Archaeology
Fellows of the British Academy
Commanders of the Order of the British Empire
Women's Auxiliary Air Force officers
Prehistorians
People associated with the Pitt Rivers Museum
British women archaeologists
British women scientists
British scientists
Archaeologists of the Near East
Natufian culture